Khim Prom, is a liquidated chemical enterprise located in Pervomaiskyi, Kharkiv region. Once it was one of the largest chemical factories in Europe.

History
Construction began in 1964. General designer - Kyiv branch of GOSNIIKHLORPROEKT, Moscow. The factory was established in 1978. After the collapse of the Soviet Union the factory worked with a minimum load, resulting in idle equipment, and at last it saw bankruptcy. Since late 2006, the factory was ready to be sold off by the government. In 2009 PVC-Himprom Ltd got the rights for this plant as a private factory. Before 2007 PVC Khimprom used this plant via lease from the Ukrainian government.

As of 2019, the buildings of the shops have been blown up. The brine production station is a communal property of Pervomaiska OTG and is offered for sale.

See also
 Kharkiv Oblast
 Pervomaiskyi

External links
 Official Website of Khimprom

References 

Buildings and structures in Kharkiv Oblast
Companies established in 1978